Matthew Blakiston (1702–1774) was a British merchant.

Matthew Blakiston may also refer to:

Sir Matthew Blakiston, 2nd Baronet (1761–1806), of the Blakiston baronets
Sir Matthew Blakiston, 3rd Baronet (1783–1862), of the Blakiston baronets
Sir Matthew Blakiston, 4th Baronet (1811–1883), of the Blakiston baronets

See also
Blakiston (disambiguation)